Bowlero Corporation (formerly known as Bowlmor AMF) is an American bowling center operator. It is the largest ten-pin bowling center operator in the world with around 300 centers, almost all of which are located in the United States. The centers have an average of 40 lanes compared to the U.S. bowling center average of 21 lanes.

As of September 2019, Bowlero Corporation is also the parent company of the Professional Bowlers Association (PBA).

The company's main bowling center brands in the United States include the namesake Bowlero brand, the upscale Bowlmor Lanes, and the legacy AMF Bowling brand. The company's U.S. centers represent 7% of the country's 4,200 commercial bowling centers.

History
Bowlmor AMF was formed in July 2013 when AMF Bowling Worldwide, which had filed for Chapter 11 bankruptcy in May 2012, reorganized and combined with Strike Holdings LLC, which operated the upscale Bowlmor Lanes. The new company was jointly owned by Bowlmor, certain of AMF Bowling's second lien lenders including an affiliate of Cerberus Capital Management, and Credit Suisse. At time of the merger, the merged company operated 272 bowling centers and had 7,500 employees and a combined annual revenue of approximately $450 million.

In the AMF Bowling reorganization, AMF's second lien lenders converted their debt into equity in Bowlmor AMF. Credit Suisse provided a $230 million term loan facility and a $30 million revolving loan facility, and the largest holders of AMF's existing second lien debt provided $50 million of backstop financing to provide working capital for Bowlmor AMF and to pay cash distributions in varying amounts to AMF's other creditors. AMF's first lien lenders received payment in full, in cash, of principal, interest at the non-default rate, and their fees.

Bowlmor Founder and CEO Tom Shannon became Chairman, Chief Executive Officer, and President of the combined company, and Bowlmor's Chief Financial Officer and former president, Brett Parker, became Vice Chairman, Chief Financial Officer, and Executive Vice President. Shannon and Parker collectively retained 22% of Bowlmor AMF and were set to receive bonuses based on their ability to increase the profitability and worth of Bowlmor AMF.

As part of the AMF Bowling reorganization, Bowlmor AMF assumed control of AMF Bowling's 50% interest in QubicaAMF Worldwide, one of the largest manufacturers of bowling products in the world. In December 2014 the Qubica founders and partners acquired this interest from Bowlmor AMF.

In July 2014, the company announced that it had agreed to acquire all 85 centers of Brunswick Bowling & Billiards in a transaction to be financed by the sale and leaseback of 58 of the centers to iStar Financial, as well as a term loan. The acquisition was completed in September 2014.

Shannon was named Bowling Proprietor of the Year in 2014 by Bowlers Journal International Magazine in recognition of his "vision and bold initiatives" to "divide the AMF bowling empire into three distinct brands."

In June 2017, private equity firm Atairos Group paid in excess of $1 billion to acquire Bowlmor AMF from its previous investors, with Shannon continuing to hold his "significant investment."
 
Bowlmor AMF changed its name to Bowlero Corporation on January 4, 2018.

On September 10, 2019, Bowlero Corporation announced it had purchased the Professional Bowlers Association (PBA). While retaining current PBA Commissioner Tom Clark, Bowlero also appointed its Chief Customer Officer, Colie Edison, to the new role of CEO for the PBA. In an interview with Lucas Wiseman, senior editor for the PBA's FloBowling channel, Edison noted that Bowlero had been in talks with the PBA leadership for a number of years, before finally deciding the time was right for the acquisition.

By January 2020, all remaining Brunswick locations were rebranded with either the Bowlero or AMF names.

On October 9, 2020, Bowlero Corporation was featured on the American TV Series Undercover Boss, with CCO Colie Edison in the role of the disguised boss.

In April 2021, Bowlero partnered with sports betting company, BettorView, in order to display sports data and wagering at multiple locations.

As of June 23, 2021, Bowlero was in merger talks with Isos Acquisition Corporation, a special-purpose acquisition company (SPAC) led by former WWE executives, to go public through a merger. On July 1, 2021, Isos Acquisition Corporation announced it had officially merged with Bowlero, with the intent to take Bowlero public and list it on the New York Stock Exchange.

Banners 
Bowlero Corporation operates bowling centers under several banners:

Bowlero centers are positioned as traditional bowling centers for open bowling, group events, and leagues, with a "hip, fun environment". Most Bowlero centers are converted AMF or Brunswick Zone centers, while a few are newly constructed or were previously operated under another name by other owners. The brand was introduced in 2014 as a renovation of the AMF Woodlands Lanes in The Woodlands, Texas, featuring "recreational games and inventive menu items set in an eclectic environment that's full of nostalgic throwbacks."
Bowlmor Lanes is positioned as a high-end banner designed solely for group events and open play, featuring lounge-styled settings and other food and entertainment options, including recreational games, private party facilities with catering services,  sports bars, and full-service restaurants. Its Times Square New York location serves as a flagship, featuring multiple areas themed on various aspects of New York City culture, a dance floor, and a mini-golf course. The company claims the Bowlmor brand has a 35-50% return on equity. 
AMF centers are carried over from the company's purchase of AMF Bowling, and are positioned as traditional bowling centers where bowling leagues play a significant role. Many former AMF locations have been converted to the Bowlero banner, while some have been sold (generally for non-bowling use).

Bowlero Corporation acquired from private owners in 2018 and 2019 a few centers which it continues to operate under their existing business names. Examples include Revel & Roll in Michigan, and The Garage in Washington state.

Controversies
From the 1960s through the early 1980s, league bowling (a weekly group event where several teams bowl against each other over the course of a season) amounted to 75% to 80% of every bowling center's business in the United States. By 2012, that percentage had dropped to 21%. Lifestyle changes in the last few decades have made league bowling less attractive. Additionally, many bowling center owners have shifted their focus to casual bowlers, who bowl at non-discounted prices and spend more on food and beverage, and to special events, which produce substantial revenue and introduce new customers to the center.

When Bowlmor Lanes purchased its first center in 1997 to renovate and upscale it, league bowling was eliminated "to ease out regulars who did not cotton to the fancy trappings or the higher prices." That strategy proved so successful that league bowling was not offered at the five other centers the company added, and by 2012 Bowlmor was one of the highest grossing bowling facility operators in North America.

When Bowlmor and AMF Bowling combined in 2013, league bowlers at AMF's existing 262 traditional bowling centers worried that the new owner would eliminate league bowling at their centers, too. Some cited a Bloomberg TV interview in which CEO Tom Shannon said, "I don’t think anyone takes bowling seriously – why would you?" Concern grew when Bowlmor AMF significantly cut the operating hours at many centers as a financial measure, and in the process, displaced or eliminated some daytime bowling leagues.

Shannon was said to have responded that, "We plan to increase the league bowling business, not shrink it," citing AMF's "large customer base" in league activity for declaring that its league bowling was "very safe." He said his company has "protected and defended 99% of (its) nighttime leagues" and sees its acquisition of the Brunswick centers as "furthering (its) commitment to league play." A company spokeswoman further stated that the company also aims to "introduce a new generation to league bowling" and wants to support professional bowling, including possible sponsorships of the Professional Bowlers Association (PBA). In October 2014 the PBA entered into an entitlement partnership agreement that will make the company an official partner of the PBA. In September 2019, Bowlero Corporation purchased the PBA.

In December 2004, Shannon said his company was severing ties with a group tied to the late Palestinian leader Yasser Arafat and was returning its $1.3 million investment.

In August 2010, five ex-employees of Bowlmor Lanes location in Manhattan's Union Square sued Shannon claiming they were dismissed because of discrimination. They also alleged that Shannon used networking sites Facebook and MySpace to screen out minorities and others he felt weren't desirable for his club. By 2017 the company was facing further scrutiny and more than 50 lawsuits from former employees at various company locations who claimed to have been terminated for their appearance.

References

External links
Corporate website
Bowlero centers website
AMF Bowling centers website
Bowlmor Lanes website

Ten-pin bowling
Bowling alleys
American companies established in 2013